Victoria Ohuruogu  (born 28 February 1993) is an English track athlete who competes in the 400 metres. She won the silver medal in the event at the 2022 Commonwealth Games.

Career
She trained with her sister Christine Ohuruogu. In March 2014, Victoria competed in the senior team relay alongside her sister Christine Ohuruogu at the World Athletics Indoor Championships in Sopot, Poland.

At the 2022 World Athletics Championships in Eugene, Oregon, Ohuruogu won the bronze medal as a member of the women's 4 x 400 metres relay team. At the 2022 European Championships, she was part of women's 4 x 400 m quartet than ran the second fastest time ever by a British women's team of 3:21.74.

Personal bests
 200 metres – 23.62 (-0.4 m/s, Los Angeles, CA 2022)
 400 metres – 50.50 (Munich 2022)
 400 metres indoor – 52.63 (Birmingham 2022)

References

External links
 

English female sprinters
British female sprinters
Living people
1993 births
English people of Igbo descent
Athletes (track and field) at the 2010 Summer Youth Olympics
European Athletics Championships medalists
World Athletics Indoor Championships medalists
World Athletics Championships medalists
20th-century British women
21st-century British women
Commonwealth Games silver medallists for England
Commonwealth Games medallists in athletics
Athletes (track and field) at the 2022 Commonwealth Games
Medallists at the 2022 Commonwealth Games